Marcel-Henri Gaussen (14 July 1891 in Cabrières-d'Aigues (Vaucluse) - 27 July 1981 in Toulouse), was a French botanist and biogeographer.

In 1926, he defended his thesis on "the vegetation of the eastern half of the Pyrenees", which laid the foundation for future work on the border between biogeography and vegetation mapping. Gaussen was an early advocate of the ideas of stages and vegetation succession, which are fundamental to phytogeography. His work allowed for the production of a vegetation map of France at a scale of 1/200 000 (completed after his death by the service of the CNRS, but which he had created and directed) and many similar projects in other countries. His work led to many advanced phytogeographic tools such as the xerothermic or Gaussen Index, and the "". As recognition for his scientific work in mapping of vegetation cover and ecology, he received the Grand Prix of the Geographical Society for geographical research and publications in 1971.

He was also responsible for the creation of the Arboretum de Jouéou in 1922, and for the strength and reputation of teaching and research in botany at the University of Toulouse. A great traveller, he was also the creator of a science section at the French Institute of Pondicherry. He worked with Flora Europaea as a regional adviser for France.

Henri Gaussen spent his entire career as a professor at Toulouse, where he was also in 1958 elected as a "" (council member) of the Académie des Jeux floraux.

Having accumulated an impressive number of personal photographs, he donated his collection to the archives of the department of Haute-Garonne, where they can still be viewed.

Principal publications 
 
  (222 pages, 8 maps and figures)

Eponymy 
genus
 (Podocarpaceae) Gaussenia A.V.Bobrov & Melikyan

Species
 (Aizoaceae) Opophytum gaussenii (Leredde) H.Jacobsen ex Greuter & Burdet
 (Araliaceae) Brassaiopsis gaussenii Bui
 (Asteraceae) Leontodon gaussenii Sennen
 (Campanulaceae) Phyteuma gaussenii Chouard
 (Cupressaceae) Juniperus gaussenii Cheng
 (Elaeocarpaceae) Elaeocarpus gaussenii Weibel
 (Moraceae) Dorstenia gaussenii J.Troch. & Koechl.
 (Pinaceae) Pseudotsuga gaussenii Flous
 (Podocarpaceae) Afrocarpus gaussenii (Woltz) C.N.Page
 (Ulmaceae) Ulmus gaussenii W. C. Cheng

Honours 
 The Henri Gaussen Prize
Presented by the Académie des sciences, inscriptions et belles-lettres de Toulouse, this prize is awarded annually for a scientific work on the Pyrenees mountain range.
 The City of Toulouse honours him with the Boulevard Henri Gaussen, in the Minimes quarter.

External links 
 village of Miglos in the Ariege, Castle Miglos. Photos from the Henri Gaussen database. see also Miglos
 Stages and vegetation zones of France, Gaussen, 1938.
 Chrono-Biographical Sketch of Gaussen from Smith at WKU
 Gaussen at balades-pyrenees.com

References 

Biogeographers
20th-century French botanists
French ecologists
1891 births
1981 deaths